Bedstemor går amok is a 1944 Danish comedy film directed by Lau Lauritzen Jr. and Alice O'Fredericks.

Cast
Petrine Sonne as Grandmother Betty Larsen
Christian Arhoff as Doctor Galde
Helge Kjærulff-Schmidt as Adam Larsen
Lily Broberg as Eva Voldoni
Sigrid Horne-Rasmussen as Juliane
Bjarne Forchhammer as Charles
Knud Heglund as Cirkus director Voldoni
Henry Nielsen as Hushovmester
Helga Frier as Tante Emma

External links

1944 films
1944 comedy films
Danish black-and-white films
Films directed by Alice O'Fredericks
Films directed by Lau Lauritzen Jr.
Danish comedy films
1940s Danish-language films